Eddy Thomas (c. 1932 – 10 April 2014) was a Jamaican dancer, choreographer and dance instructor. In 1962, Thomas and Rex Nettleford co-founded the National Dance Theatre Company of Jamaica (NDTC). Before establishing the NDTC, Thomas was a member of the Martha Graham Dance Company in New York City.

Thomas died at his home in Montego Bay, Jamaica, on 10 April 2014, at the age of 82.

References

2014 deaths
Jamaican male dancers
Jamaican choreographers
Dance teachers
Founders
People from Montego Bay
1930s births